Jason Deeble is an American author/illustrator.  His first picture book, Sir Ryan's Quest, was published by Roaring Brook Press in 2009.  It was later chosen as the One Book, Every Young Child program of southeastern Connecticut's official selection for 2011.  Originally from Delaware, Deeble now lives and works in southeastern Connecticut.

Style and influences
Deeble's style draws upon such artists as Winsor McCay and Maurice Sendak creating fantastic creatures and strange environments from ordinarily familiar childhood experiences.  These thematic elements appear frequently in Deeble's daily webcomic, Monster Haiku.

References

External links
Author's Website
Monster Haiku - Author's Webcomic
"Interview with author/illustrator Jason Deeble", Five on Friday, Michael Spradlin

American children's writers
1979 births
Living people